Eulophia dabia is a species of flowering plant in the family Orchidaceae, native from Afghanistan to south China and the Nicobar Islands. It was first described by David Don in 1825 as Bletia dabia.

Distribution
Eulophia dabia is native to Afghanistan, China (south-central, southeast and Hainan), the Indian subcontinent (Bangladesh, the east and west Himalayas, the Indian region, Nepal and Pakistan), and Central Asia (Tajikistan, Turkmenistan and Uzbekistan).

Conservation
Eulophia faberi was assessed as "vulnerable" in the 2004 IUCN Red List, where it is said to be native only to China. , E. faberi was regarded as a synonym of Eulophia dabia, which has a much wider distribution.

References

dabia
Flora of Afghanistan
Flora of the Andaman Islands
Flora of Bangladesh
Flora of South-Central China
Flora of Southeast China
Flora of East Himalaya
Flora of Hainan
Flora of India (region)
Flora of Myanmar
Flora of Nepal
Flora of the Nicobar Islands
Flora of Pakistan
Flora of the South China Sea
Flora of Tajikistan
Flora of Turkmenistan
Flora of Uzbekistan
Flora of West Himalaya
Plants described in 1825